Rhome Nixon (born February 9, 1944) is a retired Canadian football player who played for the Ottawa Rough Riders and BC Lions. He played college football at Southern University.

References

1944 births
Living people
Ottawa Rough Riders players
Canadian football wide receivers